Wrong Number also is a Bangladeshi Bengali-language film. The film released on 25 March 2004 in all over Bangladesh. The film directed by Matin Rahman and produced-distributed by Impress Telefilm Limited and it stars Riaz, Srabanti, Abdul Kader, Dolly Johur, Nasir Rahman, Tushar Khan, Amol Bose, Tahsina, Taskina and many more.

Synopsis
The story revolves around different comical events regarding telephonic conversation. Othoi (Srabanti). a young girl loves to dial wrong numbers and through such an incident, gets involved with a boy Abir ( Riaz ). The story advances through a series of humorous events.

Cast
 Riaz as Abir
 Srabanti as Othoi
 Abdul Kader as Boro Bhai
 Dolly Johur as Othoi's Aunt
 Nasir Rahman as
 Tushar Khan as Othoi's Father
 Amol Bose as Abir's Father
 Amin Tushar as Abir's Servant
 Tahsina as Othoi's College Friend
 Taskina as Othoi's College Friend

Crew
 Director: Motin Rahman
 Producer: Faridur Reza Sagar (Impress Telefilm Ltd.)
 Story: Pronabh Bhatto
 Music: Ahmed Imtiaz Bulbul, Ayub Bachchu, S I Tutul and Nachiketa
 Lyrics: Ahmed Imtiaz Bulbul (Chikun Komor), Nachiketa (Tumi Jodi), Kabir Bokul (Preme Porechhey), Marzuk Russell (Amar Bhitor Theke Nami) 
 Background Score: S I Tutul, Ayub Bachchu 
 Cinematography: Mostafa Kamal
 Editing: Amzad Hossain
 Distributor: Impress Telefilm Limited

Technical details
 Format: 35 MM (Color)
 Year of the Product: 2003
 Technical Support: Bangladesh Film Development Corporation (BFDC)

Music

Wrong Number films music directed by the Popular composers Ayub Bachchu, S I Tutul and Indian singer Nachiketa composed the music for the movie while Nachiketa, Udit Narayan, Ferdous Ara and Mehreen lent their voice for the playbacks.

Soundtrack

References

External links
 
 Shibir bars screening of films against fundamentalism

2004 films
2004 comedy-drama films
Bengali-language Bangladeshi films
Bangladeshi comedy-drama films
Films scored by Ahmed Imtiaz Bulbul
Films scored by S I Tutul
Films scored by Nachiketa Chakraborty
Films scored by Ayub Bachchu
2000s Bengali-language films
Films directed by Motin Rahman
Impress Telefilm films
Films about telephony